Ulta may refer to:

Ulta (mountain), a mountain in Peru
Ulta Beauty, a chain of beauty stores in the United States
Ulta people, indigenous ethnic group in Siberia and Japan
Ulta language, language of the Ulta people
Ulta (film), a 2019 Indian Malayalam-language comedy drama film

See also